Harrison of Paris was a publishing house originally founded in Paris in 1930 by Monroe Wheeler and Barbara Harrison Wescott.

Origins
In the 1920s Monroe Wheeler bought a small print press he named Manikin. Partnering with Barbara Harrison Wescott in 1930 they founded Harrison of Paris and specialized in limited-edition books, publishing in total 13 books, two of which by Glenway Wescott, Wheeler's longtime partner and Harrison's brother-in-law. Harrison of Paris moved to New York City in 1934, the same year it stopped production.

Catalogue

1930 Venus and Adonis by William Shakespeare
1930 The Wild West by Bret Harte, illustrations by Pierre Falké
1930 A Sketch of my Life by Thomas Mann
1930 The Babe's Bed by Glenway Wescott
1931 Fables of Aesop, translation by Sir Roger L'Estrange, illustrations by Alexander Calder
1931 Carmen and Letters from Spain by Prosper Mérimée, illustrations by Maurice Barraud
1931 The Death of Madame by Comtesse de Lafayette, translation by Monroe Wheeler
1931 A Gentle Spirit by Fyodor Dostoevsky, translation by Constance Garnett, illustrations by Christian Bérard
1931 Childe Harolde's Pilgrimage by Lord Byron, illustrations by Sir Francis Cyril Rose
1931 A Calendar of Saints for Unbelievers by Glenway Wescott, illustrations by Pavel Tchelitchew
1932 A Typographical Commonplace Book
1933 French Song-Book by Katherine Anne Porter
1934 Hacienda by Katherine Anne Porter

References

Book publishing companies of France
American companies established in 1930
Publishing companies established in 1930
Book publishing companies of the United States